The Wicked + The Divine is a contemporary fantasy comic book series created by Kieron Gillen and Jamie McKelvie, and published by Image Comics. The series is largely influenced by pop music and various mythological deities, and includes the themes of life and death in the story. The comic has received positive reviews, and was the winner of Best Comic at the 2014 British Comic Awards. It has also been noted for its diverse portrayal of ethnicity, sexuality and gender social roles.

Premise
The narrative follows a young teenage girl, Laura, as she interacts with the Pantheon, a group of twelve people who discover that they are reincarnated deities. This discovery grants them fame and supernatural powers, with the stipulation that they will die within two years as part of a ninety-year cycle known as the Recurrence.

Publication history
The series was announced on 9 January 2014, and the first issue was released in June 2014. As of March 2019, there have been 42 single issues released, four one-shot specials, one Christmas issue, and one comedy issue. The single issues, excluding the specials, are currently collected across seven trade paperbacks, and three hardcover trades. Prior to the series conclusion, a trade collecting the one-shots, Christmas issue, and comedy issue was released, considered the eighth volume.  The series is ongoing, intended to run for 45 main issues and complete in eight trade-paperback arcs, (plus one for the Specials), bringing the total to nine trade paperbacks.

Writer Kieron Gillen's original and core inspiration for The Wicked + The Divine was his father's diagnosis with terminal cancer. For this reason, Gillen considers the story to be "about life and death." Further inspiration for Gillen comes from pop music and various pop idols; the Pantheon is based on pop idols, and Gillen has created a playlist of songs to accompany the comic book.

The television rights have been optioned by Universal TV.

Plot

The narrative focuses on a group of people with superhuman powers known as "The Pantheon".  Each member of The Pantheon was at one point a normal person before being chosen to merge with the spirit of a deity.  It is said that each cycle of The Pantheon will not live past two years from the start of the series, and that every 90 years the Pantheon is reincarnated. This cycle is known as the Recurrence. It would also appear that the person who is the next reincarnation of a particular god does not get the opportunity to refuse becoming one.

Characters
Laura Wilson – The series' narrator and protagonist. A 17-year-old multiracial teenager who lives in Brockley, Laura is a "fangirl" of the Pantheon, often having to stifle her true emotions in their presence and ready to sacrifice everything to be associated with the Pantheon. After attending a performance by Amaterasu, she meets several members of the Pantheon for the first time and befriends Lucifer. While all previous Pantheons have consisted of twelve gods, Laura is revealed to possibly be the first thirteenth member, Persephone. This was later debunked by the appearance of Persephone in the 1920s Recurrence, which means that she may be the last god to be incarnated as referenced by Ananke's sister, which means that in previous Pantheons, either she went unseen by other members of the Pantheon or she was killed immediately by Minerva or Ananke. Becomes the first member of the Pantheon ever to see through the trap of godhood, give it up and help her surviving peers do the same. Sentenced for killing Ananke, but served her time and later married Cassandra. In the year 2055, calls her peers together for Cassandra's funeral and gives the reader some final advice. 
Laura's Family – Laura's mother, father and sister Jenny. Originally not knowing of Laura's secret other life as a friend of the Pantheon, they eventually find out when she is thrust into the spotlight, and learn to support her lifestyle. Killed by Ananke who frames Baphomet for the murder. The fact that Ananke killed Jenny without even realising motivates Laura to kill Ananke.
Beth – Originally one of Cassandra's interns, she is fired after leaking Cassandra and Laura's location to Baal and sets out on her own, with a grudge. Eventually joins Wōden. Took the name Nike (mythology). After being controlled by Minerva she still wants godhood and is knocked out by Robin, then arrested with the others. 
Robin and Toni – Beth's new camera team, operating in the same capacity Beth once did to Cassandra. Work for Wōden in the final phase of his plans. She as Phobos (mythology) and he as Eros (mythology). Leave after being freed from Minerva's control, only to be arrested. 
The Valkyries – A group of tall, beautiful, Asian women almost always accompanying Wōden. Kerry is one of his former valkyries and went by the name Brunhilde while with him, and after attempting to kill Wōden in order to gain his power, is crippled by Minerva; she later rejoined him. Another valkyrie, Eir looks after Sakhmet. A third named valkyrie is Göndul. Controlled by Minerva in the last arc. Freed by Dionysus and leave, only to be arrested.
David Blake – An expert in The Pantheon who doesn't believe this generation deserves them, which upsets Laura. He works with Urðr to try and identify Luci's attackers and has a son called Jon who is one of the true gods. David works with Ananke while pretending to be Wōden. As Wōden, he is often accompanied by The Valkryies, a group of human women who are all tall, Asian, and beautiful. He constantly wears a mask to hide his appearance, which is rumoured to be hideous. He is very racist, misogynistic, and a pervert. Killed by the Valkyries under Minerva's control. 
Minerva's mother and father – Minerva's parents live to profit from their daughter's newfound god-like status. Killed by Ananke, during Ananke's "attack" on Minerva. Revealed to be an unrelated couple that had been paid off by Ananke and Minerva to pose as her parents.
Campbell Family -Valentine/Baal's parents and younger siblings Alicia and Bobby. His father was killed by the Great Darkness when Baal first became a god, convincing him to sacrifice children to stop it. The remaining family was attacked again at the same time as Minerva. Baal includes his mother in the crowd of intended sacrifices to stop the Great Darkness once and for all while Minerva watches his siblings.  After the gig fails and horrified when he learns the truth, Baal lets the police pick them up. 
Tom – A fan of Persephone's who was the first to know she wanted to be known as The Destroyer. Attends Baal's final gig with his friends Nathan and Julie, finding footage of Laura on his phone after the crowd somehow survives.

The Pantheon
Every Recurrence, 12 separate gods/goddesses reincarnate into bodies of any gender. Lucifer has had the most reincarnations, appearing five times in the issues and six altogether. Minerva has appeared five times; Baal, The Morrigan, Dionysus, Inanna, Set, and Woden have appeared three times, and Amaterasu, Mimir and The Norns have appeared twice, with every other god/goddess having at least one known reincarnation. The 2010s Recurrence features the mysterious appearance of a 13th goddess, Persephone. However, it was shown during the 1920s Recurrence that Persephone also appeared, her head having been removed prior or during the events of the Recurrence. None of the other gods seemed to recognize her, which indicates either she has been killed immediately by Ananke in the past, or has been hidden by Ananke from the other gods. It has since been revealed that Minerva is not a proper god, automatically created shortly before the next Recurrence begins and working with Ananke the whole time. Thus Persephone is the proper 12th member.

Ananke appears to act along with the Pantheon, serving as their representative to the public, but is also outside of them. Unlike the others she is not a teenager and has aged, but still is able to function. She functions almost as a parent, and reveals that she gave up her divinity during an earlier cycle of The Recurrence to protect future members of The Pantheon. Although she is stern with the deities who are resurrected, she seems to have a genuine maternal connection to them, saying that she will miss them before she kills them, and crying after she does so. It is revealed she, working with Minerva, has been removing the heads of gods in the previous cycles in order to prevent the coming of the Darkness by completing a ritual using the intact heads of four gods. The gods who have had their heads removed previously do not remember having it occur in past Recurrences, as Inanna, the Morrigan and Lucifer of the 2010s cycle had their heads removed in each of their prior incarnations, but do not flee when Ananke has attempted to remove their heads in the case of Inanna and Lucifer.

Flashbacks shown to the 1923 Recurrence appear to show that each Minerva uses the power of the ritual to kill the current Ananke (each having been the previous incarnation of Minerva), and take her place for the next cycle; remembering every previous Recurrence in the process and taking the name of Ananke for that cycle. Further brief flashbacks to every Recurrence throughout history show a variety of outcomes for an Ananke awakening a Persephone. In most Ananke kills and/or takes the head of Persephone, (featuring twice where Minerva did this instead of Ananke); in some Ananke embraces Persephone as she does with the other gods; a few Persephone escape; some Persephone fight back occasionally wounding Ananke- twice killing Ananke and at least once where they killed each other. A Minerva has never been shown dying so therefore the cycle would continue through her even if something happened to the current Ananke before the ritual could be completed. Flashbacks to 3127 B.C. show the Minerva attempt to use herself in place of the fourth head; the ritual turned on her sending her into ninety years of Darkness, until the next Minerva appeared swearing to never let that happen again. The 2014 Recurrence with Laura Wilson is the first time a third party has interfered with Ananke/Minerva and Persephone's encounter.

In the final arc, Minerva reveals the truth. Ananke and her sister were part of the first group of twelve with minor talents similar to the descended Laura. Her sister discovered that labeling themselves as "gods" gave them great power, a shortcut. Though "godhood" kills one of their group after two years, Ananke found a way to cheat death by creating the Minerva role and sacrificing four heads of each generation of the twelve. All of it just to prevent the Darkness of her permanent death. As the Crone and Maiden she traps the twelve in a story, giving them "godhood" with the name of a deity specific to each individual's flaws allowing her to manipulate and sacrifice them; while also preventing them from discovering their true power as regular humans. With no heads sacrificed in the 2010s Recurrence, and both the Ananke and the Minerva having been killed, the cycle is finally free from her corruption and cannot be repeated by anyone else. Laura and her surviving peers went on to commit to the lifetime of work, using their powers without godhood to better the world. Once they all pass away naturally, the future will be a blank slate of possibility for future generations.

2014 Recurrence

 Amaterasu – Formerly Emily Greenaway, who went by the name Hazel Oak Ash Thorn Greenaway and became Amaterasu at the age of 17. A fan of Shinto culture from her childhood, she is commonly accused of cultural appropriation. Before being transformed, she was a fan of Cassandra's writing and drew a lot of fan art. Was a close friend of Eleanor before either of them became gods. She has the ability to "step" by sunlight as a way to teleport, with Wōden giving her a machine to do it by starlight. She has a very optimistic outlook on life and tries to be kind and friendly, stating that as a god she must be an inspiration. She also cares deeply for her fellow gods and others, praying for them all. Murdered by Sakhmet slashing her throat. Amaterasu's appearance appears to be based on Florence Welch. 
 Baal – Formerly Valentine Campbell. Baal was the first god to emerge from the 2014 Recurrence. He was once with Inanna, before Inanna cheated on him with Lucifer, making him overly aggressive, but still not over him. He presents himself as aggressive, but is shown to have a softer side. His powers are presented as electrical in nature, using it to make his car go faster and erect a cage of lightning. He initially claims he is Baal Hadad, but is actually the sky and fire god Baal Hammon. He was using sacrificial children once every four months to banish the Great Darkness that killed his father. Devastated when he realizes it's all a lie, only living to stop Minerva. Valentine gives up godhood without stating what it meant to him. Commits murder-suicide by falling from a ledge while holding Minerva. Though Zahid, Cassandra and Laura hate what he did, in adulthood they see him as a tragic figure trying to protect others for the greater good. Baal is visually based on Kanye West.
 Dionysus – Formerly Umar. Has the power to produce a drug-like euphoria, with the added function to control people affected by it. He first appears as a fan during The Morrigan's gig, before he is transformed. His powers have consequences though, as he can constantly hear people's voices in his head and can't sleep. Declared brain-dead after Wōden took control of a crowd of fans using Dionysus' powers. As a fan, Umar met Cameron and gave him a ride to one of The Morrigan's early gigs. Cameron would become Nergal as a result. Resurrected at the cost of Nergal's life. Umar gives up godhood along with his belief that he has to save everyone. Mentioned later in life to be married. The one whom always inspired Cassandra to be kinder. Subconsciously remembers Cameron's final words to him and the image of Cassandra dying in a hospital room which he had briefly seen after trying to record The Morrigan; but cannot remember the source of either memory.
 Inanna – Formerly Zahid. They first met Laura at the original Ragnarock before their transformation, where they blended in and mostly went ignored. Their personality changed when they were transformed, becoming more outgoing and confident. They were also a fan of Cassandra's writing. They run a Residency which can go on for weeks at a time and frequently turns into orgies. In the early days of godhood, they were in a relationship with Baal, which ended when Inanna slept with Lucifer. Their powers included Divination and "stepping" (teleporting) by starlight. Murdered by Ananke, who frames the murder on Baphomet. Head is being kept alive in order to complete the ritual to banish the darkness. Takes the body of Gentle Annie after they were freed by The Norns and Laura. Zahid gives up godhood, which they previously believed was the only way they could stand out. Misses Valentine for the rest of their life. Though disgusted at what Valentine did, they reason only someone full of love to protect others could have gone through with it. Cassandra mentions she is glad to have known Zahid. In the final issue, Zahid uses they/them pronouns. Innana is based on Prince.
 Lucifer – Formerly Eleanor Rigby (a reference to the Beatles song of the same name), who was turned into Lucifer at the age of 18. She first meets Laura after an Amaterasu concert and offers Laura divinity in exchange for her help. She enjoys being rebellious against authority and has a desire for people to notice her, which being on stage allowed her to indulge in. Her powers appear to be fire-based, often demonstrated by causing explosions and lighting cigarettes. Killed by Ananke. Head is being kept alive in order to complete the ritual to banish the darkness. Takes the body of Badb after being freed by The Norns and Laura. Eleanor initially refuses to give up godhood. Laura makes her see her dream of being on stage isn't worth it and she becomes Eleanor again. Decades later, she and Laura had tried a relationship but it didn't work out. Was never friends with Cassandra but they gained a mutual respect for each other. Eleanor is still sarcastic but gets along well with the rest of her peers later in life. Luci is visually inspired by David Bowie.
 Minerva – The youngest member of the Pantheon at 12 years old, she is kept away from important discussions by the others despite her desire to be involved. It is indicated that the reason Minerva is so young is that as a virgin goddess, her hosts can only be virgins themselves. This seems to be supported by the fact that her previous incarnation in the 1920s was also a young girl. Secretly not one of the gods and part of Ananke's form of immortality. Her supposed parents appear to control her every move, living with her in Valhalla; though they are just unrelated people paid off by Ananke and Minerva in a ruse. She has a pet mechanical owl she calls Owly. It is revealed that she has all of Ananke's knowledge and carries on their plans. Revelations shown in 1923 suggests each Minerva kills each Ananke at the end of each cycle, considering themselves one; though the two can disagree with each other. Revealed to have separate minds until the Ananke is killed, the Minerva then gaining everything. This indicates that Minerva takes the role of the Maid and Ananke the role of the Crone. Used technology like the Valkyries when she needed to pose as a performing god, and cannot sing anymore. Reveals the truth to the surviving members of the twelve when her plans are foiled. Murdered by Valentine whom deliberately falls from a great height with her, killing them both. Minerva's look is based on the military-style costumes often worn by pop stars such as The Beatles, Queen, My Chemical Romance, The Libertines, Manic Street Preachers and Cheryl.
 Mimir- Formerly Jon Blake. Turned into a god against his will and imprisoned by Ananke and his father David. David pretends to be the god Wōden while he secretly forces his son to build things for Ananke and his own plans. Jon is freed by The Norns and Laura, taking The Morrigan's body. Wōden is killed by the Valkyries under Minerva's influence. Jon gives up godhood, the only way he could make sense of what his father did to him. Jon never stopped working and built many advanced technologies for the world. May be in a relationship with Aruna. One of Cassandra's closest friends later in life. Visually based on Daft Punk.
 The Morrígan – Formerly Marian. Out of her love for her former boyfriend, she requests Ananke turn him into Baphomet. She appears in three incarnations, which have so far been named as "Badb", "Gentle Annie" (possibly Anand), and simply "Morrígan" (The Morrígan). Her personality depends on which incarnation she is in: Gentle Annie is more kind, while Badb is overly aggressive. Her powers include summoning crows as a weapon and, as Gentle Annie, she can heal. If a person tries to capture The Morrígan on camera, they will see a vision of a loved one dying. Gentle Annie sacrifices their life to bring back Nergal after Badb kills him. Two of the twelve being as close as Marian and Cameron were before discovering their abilities is rare, but Ananke/Minerva used that to her advantage. Visually, the Morrigan is based on PJ Harvey, Kate Bush, Patti Smith, Siouxsie Sioux and KatieJane Garside.
 Nergal – Formerly Cameron. After his parents died, he became withdrawn from Marian and cheated on her, but she later forgave him and asked for him to be transformed. The character goes by name Baphomet (Baph), but in the 20th issue, he reveals to Persephone (and Urðr) that he is actually the incarnation of the god Nergal. He is very sarcastic and snide as an attempt to hide his immense insecurities, particularly his fear of death. He can summon the spirits of the dead. Killed by Badb but resurrected by Gentle Annie at the cost of Marian's triple lives. He figures out Marian meant for them to constantly die to each resurrect the other one, but Laura convinces him to break free of the abuse and instead use the three bodies as new hosts for the heads of the other gods. Before facing Minerva, he becomes brain-dead to bring back Dionysus. Mentioned as deceased in the far future of 2055. He is based upon Nick Cave and Andrew Eldritch.
 Persephone – Appears at the end of the 11th issue when Ananke seemingly transforms Laura Wilson into this previously unknown member of the Pantheon. Her powers include summoning vines that burst out the ground and is also able to show others past events. Formerly pregnant with either Baal Haamon or Nergal's child. Realizes she isn't a god and becomes human again; though can still somehow summon fire and has limited performance powers. The first to descend and give up godhood, Laura helps the rest see the truth. Arrested and put on trial for the murder of Ananke. Freed later on and married Cassandra. Meets with everyone for the funeral and gives the reader parting words that the future is theirs to make: a blank slate of possibility.
 Sakhmet – Formerly Ruth Clarkson. She admired Egyptian culture from a young age. Before Ananke found her, it was hinted she was homeless, an alcoholic, and that her father abused her. When sober, she becomes murderous and cannibalistic and can only be calmed down with alcohol. Her behaviour is very catlike and she is one of the Pantheon's best fighters. Killed by Minerva after Minerva's gaining the knowledge of Ananke. Sakhmet is visually based on Rihanna as well as Gillen's cat.
 Tara – Formerly Aruna. From a young age, she suffered abuse and sexualization from all around her. She does not know which specific goddess "Tara" she is supposed to be an incarnation of (there are three options – a Buddhist Tara, a Hindu Tara, and a Polynesian Tara) and is plagued by abuse and derision from the public for refusing to perform miracles during her performances, instead performing music she wrote before her transformation. Constantly receiving rape threats and death threats, she begs Ananke to end her life and torment. She is very dismissive and withdrawn from the other gods. Head is being kept alive in order to complete the ritual to banish the darkness. Volunteers not to take a body after she is freed by The Norns and Laura; to escape the objectification she faced before. Even as a head, had the miracle of turning into a giantess in battle. Aruna gives up her godhood; while she hated being special, deep down she believed she was special in the first place. She is still a living head. In the future she has a mechanical body built by Jon whom she may be in a relationship with. Cassandra mentions Aruna's never committing a crime let her campaign for leniency for the rest of the survivors. Mastered using miracles and her own voice as one which she uses to close out the funeral. Tara is inspired by Lady Gaga and Taylor Swift as well as 1950's science fiction.
 Urðr – Before her transformation, Urðr was Cassandra Igarashi, a trans woman, reporter, and a cynical skeptic of the Pantheon's supernatural origins. As Urðr, she is revealed to be the 12th member of the Pantheon, and appears along with her two sisters Verðandi and Skuld, formerly her camera crew members Meredith and Zoe. Together, the three form The Norns. Urðr was not affected by any of the other gods' music apart from Persephone's; until she and Dionysus found a way for her to hear and feel his. Cassandra sends the other two Norns away to protect them. Cassandra gives up godhood; while she always thought the Pantheon's miracles were lies, she wanted to prove it by using miracles and didn't see the contradiction until the true nature of the twelve is revealed. The surviving members agree to her plan and get arrested. Passes away at the age of sixty-five in the year 2055, as Laura's wife. The survivors of the Pantheon gather for her funeral as a hologram of Cassandra explains what each of them meant to her. While Meredith and Zoe were never certain they were truly part of the group, Laura thanks them for what they meant to Cassandra. Cassandra says they left her speechless every day she was with them.

Reception
The Wicked + the Divine has received generally positive reviews. The review aggregation website Comic Book Roundup reports that the series holds an average score of 8.6 out of 10.

Awards
The Wicked + the Divine was the winner of Best Comic at the 2014 British Comic Awards. The series has also been nominated for the 2015 Eisner Awards in three categories: Best New Series, Best Cover Artist, and Best Coloring. In 2018, it was nominated for the Eisner Awards in the Best Continuing Series category.

Collected editions
The entire series has been collected as nine trade paperback (TPB) volumes, and also as four deluxe hardcovers (HC):

References

External links

American comics titles
Image Comics titles
2014 comics debuts
2019 comics endings
2010s LGBT literature
Fantasy comics
Dark fantasy comics
Transgender-related comics
LGBT-related comics
Mythology in comics
Fiction about reincarnation
LGBT literature in the United Kingdom